The 2014–15 UCF Knights women's basketball team will represent the University of Central Florida during the 2014–15 NCAA Division I basketball season. The Knights compete in Division I of the National Collegiate Athletic Association (NCAA) and the American Athletic Conference (The American). The Knights, in the program's 38th season of basketball, were led by eighth-year head coach Joi Williams, and play their home games at the CFE Arena on the university's main campus in Orlando, Florida. They finished the season 9–21, 5–13 in AAC play to finish in eight place. They lost in the first round in the American Athletic women's tournament to Cincinnati.

The season is UCF's second as a member of The American. UCF will entire the 2014-15 with all the assistant coaches being in their first year with the program.

Media
All UCF games will have an audio or video broadcast available. For conference play, UCF games will typically be available on ESPN3, AAC Digital, or UCF Knights All-Access. Road games not on ESPN3 or AAC Digital will have an audio broadcast available on the UCF Portal. All non-conference home games will be streamed exclusively on UCF Knights All-Access. Select non-conference road games will have a stream available through the opponents website. The audio broadcast for home games will only be available through UCF Knights All-Access.

2014–15 Roster

Schedule and results

|-
!colspan=12 style="background:#BC9B6A;"| Exhibition

|-
!colspan=12 style="background:#000000; color:#BC9B6A;"| Regular Season

|-
!colspan=12 style="background:#BC9B6A;"| 2015 AAC Tournament

|-

See also
 2014–15 UCF Knights men's basketball team

References

UCF
UCF Knights women's basketball seasons
UCF Knights
UCF Knights